Mariam Naficy is an American entrepreneur. She is the founder and CEO of the online deign marketplace Minted and previously co-founded online cosmetic retailer Eve.com.

Early life and education 
Naficy was born to Iranian and Chinese parents who are graduates of Georgetown University and were stationed abroad throughout Africa and the Middle East. Her parent was a United Nations development economist, and she spent her childhood in six countries, including Egypt, Tanzania, and Iran. She earned a degree in political science from Williams College, and then proceeded to pursue her master's degree from the Stanford Graduate School of Business in 1998.

While in business school, Naficy published The Fast Track: The Insider's Guide to Winning Jobs in Management Consulting, Investment Banking, & Securities Trading, which has sold 50,000 copies.

Career
Naficy worked as an investment banker at Goldman Sachs early in her career. In 1998 at the age of 28, she co-founded Eve.com, which later sold for $110 million to Idealab in 2000. After that, she served as Vice President and General Manager at The Body Shop, launching their first e-commerce business in 2004. 

Naficy founded the online stationary store Minted.com in 2008. It stalled at first, but grew to 400 employees by 2019.  Raising $208 million in 2018, it was the largest funding transaction that year involving a startup led by a female founder. 

Naficy has been a board member for Yelp, Polyvore, Every Mother Counts.

Works
The Fast Track: The Insider's Guide to Winning Jobs in Management Consulting, Investment Banking, and Securities Trading, Broadway Books, 1997, .

Personal life
Her husband, Michael Mader, also works at Minted. They have two children.

References

External links
 Minted
 

American businesspeople
Living people
Williams College alumni
Date of birth missing (living people)
Year of birth missing (living people)
Stanford Graduate School of Business alumni